This is a list of active ships of the Swedish Navy.

Swedish Navy 
The Swedish Navy is the naval branch of the Swedish Armed Forces. It is composed of surface and submarine naval units – the Royal Fleet (Kungliga flottan) – as well as marine units, the Amphibious Corps.

In Swedish, vessels of the Swedish Navy are given the prefix "HMS," short for Hans/Hennes Majestäts Skepp (His/Her Majesty's Ship). In English, this is often changed to "HSwMS" ("His/Her Swedish Majesty's Ship") to differentiate Swedish vessels from those of the British Royal Navy.

Swedish Coast Guard 

Even if the Swedish Coast Guard is not officially a part of the navy, and operates under the Ministry of Justice, its activities are coordinated with the Swedish Armed Forces in a number of areas. 

Out of 20 bases from Luleå to Strömstad, the Coast Guard operate along the entire coastline of Sweden, with the mission to rescue, assist and monitor.

The total number of vessels exceeds 100 of which 25 are patrol and combination vessels dedicated to maritime surveillance, 5 are environmental protection vessels and 4 are hovercraft, two of which are of the same type as operated by the navy.

While the vessels are themselves unarmed, the crews are equipped with light arms equivalent to the ones in use by the Swedish Police. 

In addition, the Coast Guard has 3 Dash 8 Q-300 aircraft for maritime surveillance. The aircraft are based at the Skavsta Airport out of Nyköping.

Maritime helicopters 

The Swedish Air Force operates three types of helicopters: NHIndustries NH90, 18 in service (Swedish designation: HKP14), AgustaWestland AW109, 20 in service (Swedish designation: HKP15) and Sikorsky UH-60 Black Hawk, 15 in service (Swedish designation: HKP16).

Thus  does not have a hangar, it can base and maintain 2 HKP15B during longer operations.

HSwMS Belos has a large helicopter platform for search and rescue purposes.

9 of the NHIndustries NH90 helicopters are equipped for anti-submarine warfare, designated HKP14F.

Submarine service

Corvettes

Minesweepers

Off-shore patrol vessels

Patrol boats

Fast attack and landing craft

Signal intelligence gathering vessels

Auxiliary ships 
Command and support ships

Ledningsbåt 2000 (2 vessel in service, 451-452)

Torpedo salvage vessels
 
Transport vessels

Trossbåt typ 600 (605, 606, 608, 610)
HSwMS Rödnäbba 

Sub-water support vessels

HSwMS Furusund (A320)
HSwMS Ägir (A212)

Coastal tug boats

Tug boats (examples)

HSwMS Eir (755)

Training ships 

Schooners
HSwMS Gladan (S01)
HSwMS Falken (S02)

Ships for navigation education 

Training ships of the Swedish Auxiliary Naval Corps (examples)
Gråskär (SVK 06) 
Östhammar (SVK 11) 
Hojskär (SVK 70) 
Bredskär (SVK 74) 
Huvudskär (SVK 77) 
Fårö (SVK 603) 
Lungö (SVK 652) 
Arn (SVK 655) 
Elon (SVK 701)

External links

Swedish Armed Forces - Official site 
Swedish Coast Guard - Official site 
Swedish Auxiliary Naval Corps - Official Site 

 Active
Ships of the Swedish Navy
Ships list
Sweden
Sweden